Kateryna Osadcha (Ukrainian: Катерина Осадча; born 12 September 1983) is a Ukrainian journalist, host of the programs "Social Life", "The Voice of Ukraine" (1–3, 6–8 seasons) and "The Voice Kids" on the TV channel "1+1". From the age of 13 to 18 she worked in the modeling business in Western Europe, after which she returned to Ukraine.

Biography 
She was born on September 12, 1983 in Kyiv. Her father — Oleksandr Osadchyi, was a Director of Kyivprylad factory, while her mother is a housewife. She also has a younger brother.

In addition to school, Katya was engaged in music and dance (she was a member of the choreographic ensemble "Little Falcons"). At the age of thirteen, she began her professional modeling career and graduated from the Bagira Agency's modeling school. At the age of 14, after finishing ninth grade, she went to film in Tokyo for three months. Later there were shootings in Germany, England and France. Kateryna passed her final exams at school externally due to a busy filming schedule.

At the age of 18, Kateryna finished her modeling career and returned to live in Ukraine. She married Oleh Polishchuk, a Member of Parliament from the Green Party, and in 2002 gave birth to a son, Ilya. Due to poor knowledge of the Ukrainian language, four months after the birth of a child she began to work with a teacher to practice the skills of speech and diction. She graduated in absentia from the Faculty of History of the University of Kyiv.

The first experience of television journalism appeared after working as a freelance correspondent for the First National Channel (in 2015 was renamed to UA:First). In 2005, Kateryna passed the casting and became the host of the project "Social life" on the TV channel "Tonis". In 2007 she became the host of the program "Social Life" at the UA:First. In August 2008, the program began airing on 1+1.

In 2009, she participated in the second season of the "1+1" show "Dancing for you" with partner Andriy Krys. In 2011 she became the host of the Ukrainian version of the international TV franchise "The Voice". In 2012, the talent show "The Voice Kids", in which Kateryna's role as a presenter changed – now she helped the children to cope with the excitement before going on stage.

From October 11, 2015 she was the host of the show "Little Giants", a Ukrainian adaptation of a Televisa show Pequeños Gigantes.

On October 31, 2017, Osadcha became a member of the jury "Model XL" along with designer Andre Tan, choreographer Vlad Yama and Latvian model Tetyana Matskevych.

Personal life 
In 2001, Katerya Osadcha married a businessman and People's Deputy from the Green Party, Oleh Polishchuk. In September 2002, she gave birth to a son, Illya. In 2004, she divorced her husband.

In February 2017, Katya Osadcha and Yuriy Gorbunov announced that they were officially married. On February 18, 2017, the couple had a child, the boy was named Ivan. On August 19, 2021, she gave birth to her third son, Daniel.

Awards and achievements 
In 2006 she became the winner of the All-Ukrainian award "Woman of the III millennium" in the nomination "Perspective".

In 2007, she took 96th place in the ranking of "100 most influential women of Ukraine" according to the "Focus" magazine and in 2013 – the 64th.

In 2009 she took 6th place in the rating "Faces of Kyiv" according to the newspaper "Afisha". That same year, Kateryna Osadcha's hat in the form of a crow sitting on a branch was marked by the British newspaper The Daily Telegraph as one of the most extravagant at the Royal Ascot equestrian race.

In February 2018, Kateryna Osadcha received the title of "Mother of the Year" according to "Viva! The most beautiful.

In April 2018, Kateryna won the state TV award "Teletriumph" in the nomination "Interviewer".

References

External links 

 

Living people
Ukrainian journalists
Ukrainian television journalists
Ukrainian television personalities
1+1 (TV channel) people
1+1 Media Group
Ukrainian women journalists
1983 births
Mass media people from Kyiv